The Ladies Open Lausanne originally founded in 1899 as the Swiss International Championships. It is a women's professional tennis tournament which is currently played in Lausanne but has played in a number of locations in Switzerland.

History
The Swiss International Championships was founded in 1897 as a men's only event and staged at the Grasshopper Club, Zurich under the auspices of the Swiss Lawn Tennis Association. In 1898 the Swiss Lawn Tennis Association staged the event at Château d’Oex. In 1899 an open women's singles event was added to the schedule, when the venue was still in Saint Moritz.
It was then hosted at multiple locations throughout its run including Gstaad. The first edition of the Gstaad International tournament was played in 1915 at the Gstaad Palace Hotel, which was known at the time as the Royal Hotel, Winter & Gstaad Palace, and was organized in collaboration with the Lawn Tennis Club (LTC) Gstaad. In 1968 the tournament was renamed the Swiss Open International Championships or simply Swiss Open Championships, and was then staged permanently at Gstaad. The women's event was called the Gstaad International from 1969.

The Swiss International Championships were staged at the following locations throughout its run including Basel, Champéry, Geneva, Gstaad, Les Avants, Montreux, Lausanne, Lugano, Lucerne, Ragatz, St. Moritz, Zermatt, and Zurich from 1897 to 1967.

The event was called the WTA Swiss Open from 1977 to 1985, and was played on outdoor clay courts. The tournament underwent a name change in 1986, when it was titled the European Open until its discontinuation. It formed part of the Women's Tennis Association (WTA) Tour. When the WTA introduced the tiering format to its circuit, the event gradually moved up, from being a Tier V in 1988–1989, a Tier IV from 1990 to 1992, and a Tier III for its remaining years. The WTA announced that the tournament would return in Gstaad as a clay event on the 2016 Tour, replacing another clay court event held in Bad Gastein.

Four Swiss players won the event: Viktorija Golubic in 2016 as well as Manuela Maleeva (who formerly represented Bulgaria) in 1991 won the singles, and Xenia Knoll (in 2016) as well as Christiane Jolissaint won the doubles, the latter on three occasions: 1983, 1984, and 1988. Maleeva holds the record, along with Chris Evert, for most singles wins; both players won the event three times, and Maleeva finished runner-up a further three occasions.

Past finals

Singles

Doubles

See also
 Swiss International Championships – men's (1897) and women's (1899) – the precursor tournament name for the ATP and WTA events
 Swiss Open – men's tournament
 Zurich Open – women's tournament (1984–2008)

Notes

References

External links
 
 ITF Women's Circuit
 WTA website

 
Tennis tournaments in Europe
Tennis tournaments in Switzerland
Recurring sporting events established in 2016
Sport in the Canton of Bern
Sport in Lausanne